Sanwan Township is a rural township in northern Miaoli County, Taiwan.  It lies between the Taiwan Strait on the west and mountains on the east.

Geography
 Area: 
 Population: 6,864 (January 2017)

Administrative divisions
The township comprises eight villages: Beipu, Dahe, Daping, Dingliao, Neiwan, Sanwan, Tongjing and Yonghe.

Politics
The township is part of Miaoli County Constituency II electoral district for Legislative Yuan.

Tourist attractions

 Yongheshan Reservoir

Notable natives
 Huang Yu-cheng, Minister of Hakka Affairs Council (2008-2014)

References

External links